Stuart Jeffrey Scheurwater (born May 6, 1983) is a Canadian Major League Baseball (MLB) umpire.  He made his MLB debut on April 25, 2014, and was hired to the full-time staff in December 2017.

Scheurwater began working Minor League Baseball games in 2007. He was hired to fill the vacancy left by Dale Scott's retirement. Scheurwater became the first permanent Major League umpire from Canada since Jim McKean's retirement in 2001.

Prior to his professional career, Scheurwater was a member of Baseball Canada’s National Umpiring program and worked the Baseball Canada Cup in 2005 Medicine Hat and the 21U National Championship in 2006 in Guelph, Ontario.

See also 
 List of Major League Baseball umpires

References

External links

 Retrosheet
 MLB.com video from his MLB debut

1983 births
Living people
Baseball people from Saskatchewan
Canadian expatriate baseball people in the United States
Major League Baseball umpires
Sportspeople from Regina, Saskatchewan